Digby (also Dugby, Dukay) is an unincorporated community in Wood County, Ohio, United States.

Notes

Unincorporated communities in Wood County, Ohio
Unincorporated communities in Ohio